Passage de Vénus is a series of photographs of the transit of the planet Venus across the Sun on 9 December 1874. They were purportedly taken in Japan by the French astronomer Jules Janssen and Brazilian engineer Francisco Antônio de Almeida using Janssen's 'photographic revolver'.

It is the oldest "film" listed on IMDb and Letterboxd.

A 2005 study of the surviving material concluded that all the extant plates made with the photographic revolver are practice plates shot with a model, and that none of the many plates successfully exposed during the eclipse seem to have survived or have not yet been located.

See also
 The Horse in Motion, 1878 series of photographs
 Transit of Venus, 1874

References

External links
 
 
 

1870s photographs
1874 films
1870s short films
Documentary films about outer space
Films directed by Pierre Janssen
Films shot in Japan
French documentary films
Transit of Venus
Venus in film
French silent short films
1874 directorial debut films